William Carlisle Towery (June 20, 1920 – November 25, 2012), nicknamed "Blackie" or "Big Boy", was an American professional basketball player.

A 6'5" (1.96 m) forward-center, Towery played for the Western Kentucky University Hilltoppers from 1938 to 1941. He was a two-time All-America selection and the first Hilltopper to score 1,000 points. He also led the Hilltoppers to three Southern Intercollegiate Athletic Association titles.

After graduating, Towery began his professional career with the Fort Wayne Zollner Pistons of the National Basketball League. He played three seasons with the Pistons before entering military service in World War II, where he earned a Bronze Star as an infantryman. He then returned to the Pistons in 1946, and remained with the team as they joined the Basketball Association of America (the modern NBA) in 1948. Towery spent half a season with the Pistons in the BAA, and later served stints for the Indianapolis Jets and Baltimore Bullets. When he retired from basketball in 1950, he had scored 2,317 combined NBL/NBA points.

In 2003, Western Kentucky University retired his #42 college jersey. He became the sixth Hilltopper to receive such honors. Towery died on November 25, 2012 at the age of 92.

BAA/NBA career statistics

Regular season

Notes

External links

1920 births
2012 deaths
All-American college men's basketball players
American men's basketball players
Baltimore Bullets (1944–1954) players
Basketball players from Kentucky
Centers (basketball)
Fort Wayne Pistons players
Fort Wayne Zollner Pistons players
Indianapolis Jets players
People from Marion, Kentucky
Power forwards (basketball)
Western Kentucky Hilltoppers basketball players